The Battle of Modena (12 June 1799) saw a Republican French army commanded by Jacques MacDonald attack a Habsburg Austrian covering force led by Prince Friedrich Franz Xaver of Hohenzollern-Hechingen. The outnumbered Austrians were defeated but in an accidental encounter, MacDonald was painfully wounded by two saber cuts. The action occurred during the War of the Second Coalition, part of a larger conflict known as the French Revolutionary Wars.

In the battles of Magnano and Cassano, the Austrians and allied Russian Empire forces swept the French from much of northern Italy in April 1799. MacDonald collected the French occupying forces in south and central Italy into an army and marched north to retrieve the situation. Bursting out of the Apennine Mountains, the French divisions of Jean-Baptiste Olivier and François Watrin mauled Hohenzollern's division at Modena. MacDonald swung west to fight the Coalition forces. The next action would be the Battle of Trebbia from 17 to 19 June.

References

Battles of the War of the Second Coalition
Battles of the French Revolutionary Wars
Battles involving Austria
Battles involving France
Battles involving Italy
Conflicts in 1799
History of Modena
Modena